A superparabola is a geometric curve defined in the Cartesian coordinate system as a set of points  with

The equation defines an open curve in the rectangle .

The superparabola can vary in shape from a rectangular function ,  to a semi-ellipse (to a parabola , to a pulse function .

Mathematical properties 

Without loss of generality we can consider the canonical form of the superparabola 

When , the function describes a continuous differentiable curve on the plane. The curve can be described parametrically on the complex plane as

Derivatives of the superparabola are given by

The area under the curve is given by 

where  is a global function valid for all ,

The area under a portion of the curve requires the indefinite integral
    
where  is the Gaussian hypergeometric function. An interesting property is that any superparabola raised to a power  is just another superparabola; thus

The centroid of the area under the curve is given by

where the -component is zero by virtue of symmetry. Thus, the centroid can be expressed as one-half the ratio of the area of the square of the curve to the area of the curve.

The nth (mathematical) moment is given by

The arc length of the curve is given by

In general, integrals containing  cannot be found in terms of standard mathematical functions. Two instances of exact solutions have been found. For the semicircle ,  and the parabola , .

The area under the curve decreases monotonically with increasing .

Generalization 
A natural generalization for the superparabola is to relax the constraint on the power of x. For example,

where the absolute value was added to assure symmetry with respect to the y-axis. The curve can be described parametrically on the complex plane as well,

Now, it is apparent that the generalized superparabola contains within it the superellipse, i.e., and its generalization. Conversely, the generalization of the superellipse clearly contains the superparabola. Here, however, we have the analytic solution for the area under the curve.

The indefinite and definite integrals are given by

History 
The superellipse has been identified since 1818 as a Lamé curve. It appears that the superparabola was first identified by Löffelmann and Gröller. in their paper on superquadrics in conjunction with computer graphics. Waldman and Gray used the superparabola in their analyses of the Archimedean hoof. The "cylinder hoof", "hoof" or "ungula" was first formulated in a letter from Archimedes to Eratosthenes in the 3rd century BC and led to the classic Propositions 13 and 14 of The Method. This letter now transposed in Dijksterhuis is one of the most famous exchange of ideas in all history of mathematics.

Applications 
The superparabola and its generalization have been applied to the Archimedean hoof. Briefly, the Archimedean hoof consists of a right cylinder with a footprint  and height  that is cut by the plane . The base area, volume, and center of mass of both the hoof and the complement can be described solely in terms of the universal function,  and height.

See also
 Superellipse
 Superquadrics
 Superformula

References

Specific

General
 Classic Study of Curves, G. S. Carr, Formulas and Theorems in PURE MATHEMATICS, 2nd ed., Chelsea Publishing Co., New York, 1970. Reprint of Carr's 1886 edition under the title of A Synopsis of Elementary Results in Pure Mathematics, London and Cambridge.
 A. Bellos, Alex's Adventures in Numberland, Bloomsbury, UK, 2011.
 H. Boualem and R. Brouzet, To Be (a Circle) or Not to Be?, The College Mathematics Journal, 46 (3) May, 2015, 197-206.
 P. Bourke, Supershapes (Superformula), http://paulbourke.net/geometry/supershape/, March 2002. 
 G. Cardillo, Superformula Generator 2d (Feb. 2006), Matlab File Exchange http://www.mathworks.com/matlabcentral/fileexchange/10189-superformula-generator-2d.
 G. Cardillo, Superformula Generator 3d (Feb. 2006), Matlab File Exchange http://www.mathworks.com/matlabcentral/fileexchange/10190-superformula-generator-3d.
 J. Gielis, A generic geometric transformation that unifies a wide range of natural and abstract shapes, American Journal of Botany 90 (3): 333–338, 2003.
 G. Lamé,  Leçons sur les coordonnées curvilignes et leurs diverses applications, Paris, Mallet-Bachelier, 1859. 
 P. Lynch, Sharing a Pint, ThatsMaths, 2012 http://thatsmaths.com/2012/12/13/sharing-a-pint.
 K.B. Oldham, J. Myland, J. Spanier, An Atlas of Functions, 2nd ed, Springer, 2010.
 E. W. Weisstein, CRC Concise Encyclopedia of Mathematics, CRC Press, 2003.

External links
 Archimedean Hoof
 Animation of Archimedean Hoof
 Superparabola
 More on the Parabola
 http://www.cs.drexel.edu/~crorres/Archimedes/contents.html More on Archimedes
 Palimpsest of Archimedes
 Restoring The Archimedes Palimpsest
 Curves
 More Curves

California State University, Los Angeles